Work Improvement in Small Enterprises (WISE) is a practical programme developed by the International Labour Organization for improvement of occupational health and safety conditions - in particular small and medium-sized enterprises (SMEs).  It is a highly pragmatic approach that focus on simple low-cost interventions which improve both labor productivity and work conditions at the same time.  A complete training package with an action manual and a trainers' manual is available from the ILO.

The programme has found particular use in developing economies.

The programme was originally launched as a PIACT activity in 1976.

References

Resources
  (Action manual)

  (Trainers' manual)

Work Improvement in Small Enterprises (WISE)
Organizations related to small and medium-sized enterprises